Victoria is a 2008 French-Canadian road movie directed by and starring Anna Karina in her last film role before her death a little over a decade after it was released.

Cast
 Anna Karina
 Jean-François Moran
 Louis Woodson
 Emmanuel Reichenbach
 Sylvie de Morais-Nogueira
 Sophie Desmarais

References

External links

2008 films
French road movies
Quebec films
2000s road movies
Films directed by Anna Karina
French-language Canadian films
Canadian road movies
2000s Canadian films
2000s French films